Roberto Levermann is a Mexican actor and writer. Born in Mexico City, Mexico, he began his acting career in 1993 on Mexico City's theatrical stages, from that year to 2000 he performed in over 15 plays, some of which were written by himself.

In 2000 he moved to Miami, Florida, where he stayed and made a solid career in the Hispanic TV on the two top Hispanic networks: Telemundo and Univision.

As a writer he has been appointed to be one of the writers for Seguro y Urgente and the head writer for Corriendo y Grabando.

Telenovelas
 Alma Indomable (2009) as Theofilo "Theo"
 Perro Amor (2009) as Usnavy Murillo
 Olvidarte Jamas (2006) as Edelmiro Correa
 Prisionera (2004) as Maximo Gallardo
 ¡Anita, no te rajes! (2005) as Venustiano Gonzalez
 Amor Descarado (2003) as Homero Silva

Other TV shows
 ATM (2005) as Clodomiro de la Garza
 Decisiones (2005) as Lalo
 Loteria (2006) as Isaias London
 Tomalo Suave (2007) as Romulo
 Seguro y Urgente (2007) as Joselo Sanchez

External links
 
 Roberto Levermann on Telemundo

Living people
Mexican male writers
Mexican male stage actors
Male actors from Mexico City
Writers from Mexico City
Mexican emigrants to the United States
Mexican male telenovela actors
Male actors from Miami
Year of birth missing (living people)